Pterocarya, often called wingnuts in English, are trees in the walnut family Juglandaceae. They are native to Asia. The botanic name is from Ancient Greek  (pteron) "wing" +  (karyon) "nut".

Description
Pterocarya are deciduous trees, 10–40 m tall, with pinnate leaves 20–45 cm long, with 11–25 leaflets; the shoots have chambered pith, a character shared with the walnuts (Juglans) but not the hickories (Carya) in the same family.

The flowers are monoecious, in catkins. The seed catkins when mature (about six months after pollination) are pendulous, 15–45 cm long, with 20–80 seeds strung along them.

The seeds are a small nut 5–10 mm across, with two wings, one each side. In some of the species, the wings are short (5–10 mm) and broad (5–10 mm), in others longer (10–25 mm) and narrower (2–5 mm).

Species
There are six species. 

 
Another species from China, the wheel wingnut with similar foliage but an unusual circular wing right round the nut (instead of two wings at the sides), previously listed as Pterocarya paliurus, has now been transferred to a new genus, as Cyclocarya paliurus.

Hybrids
Pterocarya × rehderiana - (P. fraxinifolia × P. stenoptera).

Uses
Wingnuts are very attractive, large and fast-growing trees, occasionally planted in parks and large gardens. The most common in general cultivation outside Asia is P. fraxinifolia, but the most attractive is probably P. rhoifolia. The hybrid P. × rehderiana, a cross between P. fraxinifolia and P. stenoptera, is even faster-growing and has occasionally been planted for timber production. The wood is of good quality, similar to walnut, though not quite so dense and strong.

External links
Flora of China - Pterocarya
Flora of China - Cyclocarya